I Am a Bird Now is the second album by New York City band Antony and the Johnsons.  It won the Mercury Prize on September 6, 2005. After winning the prize, the album shot up the UK albums chart from #135 to #16 in one week, the biggest jump in the history of the Mercury Music Prize. As of September 2011, UK sales stood at 220,000 copies.

The album features guest appearances by Rufus Wainwright ("What Can I Do?"), Devendra Banhart, Joan Wasser and by lead singer Anohni's childhood heroes Boy George and Lou Reed.  The cover is a photograph by Peter Hujar of Warhol superstar Candy Darling on her deathbed (aptly titled "Candy Darling on Her Deathbed").

Reception

I Am a Bird Now received very positive reviews. On the review aggregate site Metacritic, the album has a score of 88 out of 100, indicating "universal acclaim."

Drowned in Sounds Anthony Gibbons gave the album a score of 10/10, writing "It's not an exaggeration. This isn't hype. I Am A Bird Now is a beautiful, emotive, glorious, and sometimes sinister album that will top many a critic's list come the end-of-year polls, and justifiably so." Tiny Mix Tapes also gave the album a perfect score, writing "This music grabs a hold of you and doesn't let go. It feels timeless and gorgeous and bigger than life. It may not be 'soul' in the strict, music appreciation 101 sense, but it could make even the most jaded atheist approach a metaphysical regard... I'd put on my critic's cap and dive into scrutiny, but I am too enraptured by this artist's music." Pitchforks Brandon Stosuy praised the vocals, writing "The ultimate draw is [Anohni's] voice, and within the first two seconds of the album, it should be very clear to even the most unaware newbies that [Anohni] has an amazing Nina Simone/Brian Ferry [sic]/Jimmy Scott vibrato, a multi-octave siren that would sound painfully lovely no matter what [she] was saying."

The album has appeared on several end of year lists. Mojo named I Am a Bird Now the best album of 2005. Pitchfork ranked the album #5 on its list of the top 50 albums of 2005. On the same website, the track "Hope There's Someone" was ranked #28 on their list of the Top 500 Songs of the 2000s and was selected as 2005's best single. In 2019, the album was ranked 40th on The Guardian'''s 100 Best Albums of the 21st Century list.

Track listing

Personnel
The following people contributed to I Am a Bird Now:ANOHNI and the Johnsons
ANOHNI – organ, piano, vocals
Julia Kent – cello
Tahrah Cohen – drums
Jeff Langston – bass
Maxim Moston – violin
Doug Wieselman – saxophone

Additional personnel
Devendra Banhart – guitar (Track 5), vocals (Track 8)
Steve Bernstein – horn
John Bollinger - drums (Track 5)
Keith Bonner - flute
Boy George – vocals (Track 5)
Parker Kindred - drums (Track 7)
Danielle Farina - viola (Tracks 2,9)
Jason Hart – piano (Track 6)
Rainy Orteca - bass (Track 7)
Lou Reed – guitar and vocals (Track 7)
Paul Shapiro – horn
Rufus Wainwright – vocals (Track 6)
Joan Wasser – viola
Julia Yasuda - Morse Code, vocals (Track 9)
Emery Dobyns - Engineer and mixer.

Charts

Weekly charts

Year-end charts

Singles

Certifications and sales

References

External links
[http://Discogs.com/Antony-And-The-Johnsons-I-Am-A-Bird-Now/release/434979 I Am A Bird Now''  at Discogs
I Am A Bird Now statistics and tagging at Last.FM
I Am A Bird Now press release at Secretly Canadian

2005 albums
Antony and the Johnsons albums
Mercury Prize-winning albums
Secretly Canadian albums
Transgender-related music
LGBT-related albums